Greatest Hits is a greatest hits album by English rock band the Cure. It was first released in Japan on 7 November 2001, before being released in the UK and Europe on 12 November and then in the US the day after. The band's relationship with longtime label Fiction Records came to a close, and the Cure were obliged to release one final album for the label. Lead singer Robert Smith agreed to release a greatest hits album under the condition that he could choose the tracks himself. The band also recorded a special studio album released as a bonus disc to some versions of the album. The disc, titled Acoustic Hits, consists of the eighteen songs from the North American release re-recorded using acoustic instruments.

History
Greatest Hits features select singles from the Cure's then-25 year history, along with the two new tracks "Cut Here" and "Just Say Yes". All songs were newly remastered by Tim Young at Metropolis Mastering specifically for the collection.

The UK and international editions of the album feature a similar track listing, with the exception of three songs that only appear on one or the other: the international release features "The Walk", while the UK release excludes it in favour of "The Caterpillar" and "Pictures of You".

In an effort to provide something new for the hardcore fans who owned the previously released songs, Smith arranged for the band and former member Boris Williams to re-record acoustic versions of the Greatest Hits. Only the select first pressings of Greatest Hits were bundled with the bonus disc of Acoustic Hits.

Greatest Hits was also released on VHS and DVD. The video track listing mirrors that of the North American audio CD, with the exception of "The Caterpillar", "Pictures of You" and "Close to Me (Closest Mix)" which appear as hidden Easter eggs. Six of the acoustic performances also appear on the DVD.

The first vinyl version of this album was released on Record Store Day 2017 (22 April 2017) as two LP picture discs by the label Elektra Catalog Group. A quantity of 3250 were pressed. The release does not include the content of the Acoustic Hits disc, which was given its own standalone release on standard black vinyl.
On 5 July 2019, the album reached a new peak of number 19 in the UK Albums Chart following the Cure's headline set at that year's Glastonbury Festival.

Track listing

UK (Fiction/Polydor) release

International (Fiction/Polydor and Elektra) release 
"Boys Don't Cry"
"A Forest" (Shortened Edit)
"Let's Go to Bed"
"The Walk" Single release only
"The Lovecats"
"In Between Days"
"Close to Me" (Remix)
"Why Can't I Be You?"
"Just Like Heaven" (Bob Clearmountain Remix)
"Lullaby"
"Lovesong" (Remix)
"Never Enough" (Single Version)
"High" (Single Mix)
"Friday I'm in Love"
"Mint Car" (Radio Mix)
"Wrong Number" (Single Mix)
"Cut Here"
"Just Say Yes"

Bonus disc (Acoustic Hits)
Acoustic Hits, the bonus disc features newly recorded acoustic versions of songs.
"Boys Don't Cry"
"A Forest"
"Let's Go to Bed"
"The Walk"
"The Lovecats"
"Inbetween Days"
"Close to Me"
"Why Can't I Be You?"
"Just Like Heaven"
"Lullaby"
"Lovesong"
"Never Enough"
"High"
"Friday I'm in Love"
"Mint Car"
"Wrong Number"
"Cut Here"
"Just Say Yes"

Record Store Day 2017 release 
Disc 1, Side A
"Boys Don't Cry"
"A Forest"
"Let's Go to Bed"
"The Walk"
"The Lovecats"
Disc 1, Side B
"Inbetween Days"
"Close to Me"
"Why Can't I Be You?"
"Just Like Heaven"
"Lullaby"
Disc 2, Side A
"Lovesong"
"Never Enough"
"High"
"Friday I'm in Love"
Disc 2, Side B
"Mint Car"
"Wrong Number"
"Cut Here"
"Just Say Yes"

Personnel
The following is the personnel for the Greatest Hits disc, and does not apply to the Acoustic Hits bonus disc.

Robert Smith – vocals, guitar (all tracks)
Porl Thompson - guitar (tracks 6, 7, 8, 9, 10, 11, 12, 13 and 14)
Michael Dempsey - bass guitar (track 1)
Simon Gallup – bass guitar (all except tracks 1, 3, 4 and 5)
Perry Bamonte – guitar (tracks 13, 14, 15, 16, 17 and 18)
Matthieu Hartley - keyboards (track 2)
Roger O'Donnell – keyboards (tracks 10, 11, 15, 16, 17 and 18)
Lol Tolhurst - drums (tracks 1 and 2), keyboards (tracks 3, 4, 5, 6, 7, 8, 9 and 10)
Steve Goulding - drums (track 3)
Jason Cooper – drums, percussion (tracks 15, 16, 17 and 18)
Boris Williams – drums (tracks 6, 7, 8, 9, 10, 11, 12, 13 and 14)
Andy Anderson – drums (tracks 4 and 5)
Phil Thornalley – bass guitar (track 4)
Saffron – backing vocals (track 19)
Tim Young – remastering at Metropolis Mastering

Charts

Certifications

References

2001 greatest hits albums
The Cure compilation albums
Elektra Records compilation albums
Elektra Records video albums
Fiction Records compilation albums
Fiction Records video albums
Polydor Records compilation albums
Polydor Records video albums